Victoria Inner Harbour Airport or Victoria Harbour Water Airport  is located in Victoria Harbour, adjacent to Victoria, British Columbia, Canada.

The airport is classified as an airport of entry by Transport Canada and is staffed by the Canada Border Services Agency (CBSA). CBSA officers at this airport can handle small airline and general aviation aircraft only, with no more than 15 passengers. The facility can be used only by floatplanes and seaplanes.

In 2007, the link to Vancouver Harbour Water Airport was, according to the Official Airline Guide, Canada's busiest air route by the number of weekly flights.

Airlines and destinations

Passenger

See also
 List of airports in Greater Victoria

References

External links
 Victoria Inner Harbour Airport at Harbour Air Seaplanes

 Harbour Air
 Arrivals/Departures
Kenmore Air

Certified airports in British Columbia
Transport in the Capital Regional District
Transport in Victoria, British Columbia
Seaplane bases in British Columbia